Laurent Pellet (born 31 July 1970) is a Swiss judoka. He competed in the men's lightweight event at the 1992 Summer Olympics.

Achievements

References

External links
 

1970 births
Living people
Swiss male judoka
Olympic judoka of Switzerland
Judoka at the 1992 Summer Olympics